Souleye is a village and rural commune in the Cercle of Macina in the Ségou Region of southern-central Mali. The commune covers an area of approximately 388 square kilometers and includes 10 villages. In the 2009 census the commune had a population of 9,885.

References

External links
.

Communes of Ségou Region